George Raines (November 10, 1846 in Pultneyville, Wayne County, New York – November 27, 1908 in Rochester, Monroe County, New York) was an American lawyer and politician from New York.

Life
He was the son of Rev. John Raines (1818–1877) and Mary (Remington) Raines (1815–1889). He attended the common schools and Elmira Free Academy, and graduated from the University of Rochester in 1866. Then he studied law, was admitted to the bar in December 1867, and practiced in Rochester.

He entered politics as a Republican, joined the Liberal Republicans in 1872, and then remained a Democrat.

He was District Attorney of Monroe County from 1872 to 1877; and a member of the New York State Senate (28th D.) in 1878 and 1879.

He was buried at the Mount Hope Cemetery, Rochester.

Congressman John Raines (1840–1909) and State Treasurer Thomas Raines (1842-1924) were his brothers.

References
 Civil List and Constitutional History of the Colony and State of New York compiled by Edgar Albert Werner (1884; pg. 291)
 The State Government for 1879 by Charles G. Shanks (Weed, Parsons & Co, Albany NY, 1879; pg. 67f)
 George Raines in NYT on November 28, 1908

External links

1846 births
1908 deaths
New York (state) state senators
People from Wayne County, New York
New York (state) Democrats
Politicians from Rochester, New York
County district attorneys in New York (state)
University of Rochester alumni
Burials at Mount Hope Cemetery (Rochester)
New York (state) Republicans
New York (state) Liberal Republicans
Lawyers from Rochester, New York